Saisavali Bhiromya, the Princess Suddhasininat Piyamaharaj Padivaradda, born Princess Sai Ladavalya of Siam (4 September 1862 – 24 June 1929) was a consort of Chulalongkorn, the King of Siam.

Early life 
She was a daughter of Ladavalya, Prince Bhumindra Bhakdi and Lady Chin. Her sisters, Ubolratana Narinaga and Saovabhark Nariratana, also became wives of Chulalongkorn

Princess Saisavalibhirom died on 24 June 1929 at the age 66.

Ancestors

References 

Thai princesses consort
Thai female Phra Ong Chao
Consorts of Chulalongkorn
19th-century Thai women
19th-century Chakri dynasty
20th-century Thai women
20th-century Chakri dynasty
People from Bangkok
19th-century Thai people
1862 births
1929 deaths
Thai female Mom Chao